Monochrome printmaking is a generic term for any printmaking technique that produces only shades of a single color. While the term may include ordinary printing with only two colors — "ink" and "no ink" — it usually implies the ability to produce several intermediate colors between those two extremes.

In contrast with color printing, monochrome printing needs only a single ink and may require only a single pass of the paper through the printing press.

Techniques

Monochrome printmaking techniques include:

 Mezzotint
 Aquatint
 Lithography
 Halftoning

See also 

 Monochrome painting
 Monochrome photography
 Monochromatic image

References 

Printmaking